Harris Township may refer to:

 Harris Township, Stone County, Arkansas, in Stone County, Arkansas
 Harris Township, Fulton County, Illinois
 Harris Township, St. Joseph County, Indiana
 Harris Township, Michigan
 Harris Township, Itasca County, Minnesota
 Harris Township, Ripley County, Missouri
 Harris Township, Franklin County, North Carolina, in Franklin County, North Carolina
 Harris Township, Stanly County, North Carolina, in Stanly County, North Carolina
 Harris Township, Ottawa County, Ohio
 Harris Township, Centre County, Pennsylvania

Township name disambiguation pages